Karl Gustaf Scherman (born August 30, 1938) is a Swedish economist and government official. He obtained degrees of Master of Engineering from the KTH Royal Institute of Technology in Stockholm and as Master of Business Administration from the Stockholm School of Economics.

Between 1981 and 1986 he served as the general director of the Swedish Social Insurance Agency. During his tenure, the retirement age was raised to 65. From 1993 to 1998, he was president of the International Social Security Association. From 1976 to 1978, he was Secretary of State of the Swedish Ministry of Housing.

References

1938 births
Living people
Swedish politicians
Swedish economists
Stockholm School of Economics alumni